The 1966–67 Ranji Trophy was the 33rd season of the Ranji Trophy. Bombay won the title defeating Rajasthan in the final. This was the sixth final in seven years between the teams all of which were won by Bombay.

Group stage

South Zone

North Zone

East Zone

West Zone

Central Zone

Knockout stage

Final

Scorecards and averages
Cricketarchive

References

External links

1967 in Indian cricket
Ranji Trophy seasons
Domestic cricket competitions in 1966–67